Kissee Mills (pronounced "Kiz-zē' Mills") is a census-designated place in Taney County, Missouri, United States. It is located on U.S. Route 160, approximately five miles east of Forsyth. Kissee Mills is part of the Branson, Missouri Micropolitan Statistical Area.

Demographics

History
A post office called Kissee Mills has been in operation since 1871. The community has the name of A. C. Kissee, the proprietor of a local mill.

References

Census-designated places in Taney County, Missouri
Branson, Missouri micropolitan area